

See also
 Lists of UK R&B Albums Chart number ones
 Lists of UK Singles Chart number ones
 Lists of UK Dance Singles Chart number ones
 Lists of UK Independent Singles Chart number ones
 Lists of UK Singles Downloads Chart number ones
 Lists of UK Rock & Metal Singles Chart number ones

External links
R&B Singles Chart at the Official Charts Company
UK Top 40 RnB Singles at BBC Radio 1